Chavar Kalayeh may refer to:
 Chavar Kalayeh, Rudsar
 Chavar Kalayeh (37°06′ N 50°18′ E), Rudsar